Jochen Mannhart (born 24 April 1960 in Metzingen) is a German physicist.

Biography 

Jochen Mannhart studied physics at the University of Tübingen, Germany, from 1980 to 1986, where he also received his PhD in 1987 and his habilitation in 1994.

From 1987 to 1989, he was a visiting scientist at the IBM Thomas J. Watson Research Center in Yorktown Heights, NY. From 1989 to 1996, he was a Research Staff Member at the IBM Zurich Research Laboratory, where he was manager of the New Materials and Heterostructures research group. From 1996 to 2011, he was a chaired professor at the Center for Electronic Correlations and Magnetism at the University of Augsburg, Germany.

Since the summer of 2011, he has been a director of the Max Planck Institute for Solid State Research in Stuttgart, where he is head of the Solid State Quantum Electronics department.

Prizes and awards 

The 2014 European Physical Society Condensed Matter Division Europhysics Prize is awarded to Jochen Mannhart.
He was the 2008 recipient of the Gottfried Wilhelm Leibniz Prize of the Deutsche Forschungsgemeinschaft (German Research Society, DFG), award endowment 2.5 million euros, for his research in the field of experimental solid-state physics. In 1986, he received the Friedrich Forster Prize of the University of Tübingen, Germany.

Research 

Mannhart’s research includes the fabrication of novel all-oxide field-effect transistors, in which phase changes can be switched at interface layers, including phase changes to superconductivity. Under his leadership, his research group has developed an improved scanning probe microscope (frequency-modulated lateral force microscopy), which features a resolution of 77 picometers. With this instrument, his group succeeded in imaging individual atoms with subatomic resolution, which was used, for example, to investigate the atomic mechanism of friction. With P. Chaudhari and D. Dimos, J. Mannhart revealed that grain alignment is key to the fabrication of high-temperature superconductors with useful critical currents, so that they are suitable for practical applications such as modern high-Tc superconducting cables. In 2019, his group discovered Thermal Laser Epitaxy (TLE), a new epitaxy technique that uses continuous-wave laser to evaporate sources of material which then condense upon a substrate. Another research area is thermoelectronic generators.

Key Publications 

 
 
 
 
 
 
 
 
 
 
 
 </ref>

References

External links 
 Solid State Quantum Electronics department at the Max Planck Institute for Solid State Research
 

Living people
1960 births
21st-century German physicists
Scientists from Baden-Württemberg
Max Planck Institute directors
University of Tübingen alumni
Academic staff of the University of Augsburg
IBM people
Fellows of the American Physical Society